Midwest Farmer's Daughter is the debut studio album by American country singer Margo Price. Released on March 25, 2016, it was the first country album to be released on Third Man Records. Despite the album's limited commercial success, peaking at No. 189 on the Billboard 200, it is considered by many publications and music critics to be one of 2016's best albums.

Production
Midwest Farmer's Daughter was recorded live to analog tape at the famed Sun Studio in Memphis, Tennessee and mixed at the nearby Ardent Studios.

Critical reception

Midwest Farmer's Daughter received highly positive reviews from music critics. At Metacritic, which assigns a normalized rating out of 100 to reviews from mainstream critics, the album has an average score of 86 out of 100, which indicates "universal acclaim" based on 13 reviews.

Will Hermes of Rolling Stone gave the album a favorable review, describing the vocal style of Price as "restrained yet mighty, her songcraft amazingly vivid, and the arranging instinct spot on". Hermes noted that Price had a "taste for retro styling", and that starting from the opening song, "Hands of Time", "you're reminded of the incredible power that lies in tradition well-used. It's a power the rest of this record makes plain." Stephen Thomas Erlewine of AllMusic saw  Loretta Lynn as the primary inspirations of Price, but thought that even though the album may drift toward the traditional in some songs, "Price's sensibility is modern, turning these old-fashioned tales of heartbreak, love, loss, and perseverance into something fresh and affecting." Paul Grein of Hits Daily Double predicted the album would be in contention for the Album of the Year award at the 59th Annual Grammy Awards.

Accolades

Commercial performance
Midwest Farmer's Daughter debuted at No. 189 on the Billboard 200. It also debuted at No. 10 on the Billboard Top Country Albums chart, the first time in the history of the chart (which started in 1964) a solo female has debuted in the top 10 with her first release without also having any history on the Hot Country Songs chart. As of June 2017 the album has sold 52,600 copies in the United States.

Track listing

Personnel
Adapted from AllMusic.

Musicians
 Jeremy Ivey – bass guitar, acoustic guitar, harmonica
 Kevin Black – background vocals
 Jamie Davis – electric guitar
 Eleonore Denig – violin
 Josh Hedley – harmony
 Micah Hulscher – Fender Rhodes, organ, piano
 Larissa Maestro – cello
 Alex Munoz – Dobro, acoustic guitar, mandolin, background vocals
 Dillon Napier – drums, percussion
 Margo Price – acoustic guitar, harmony, vocals
 Matt Ross-Spang – wah-wah guitar
 Luke Schneider – pedal steel guitar
 Kristin Weber – fiddle, violin, harmony, background vocals
 Eric Whitman – background vocals

Technical personnel
 John Baldwin – mastering
 Danielle Holbert – photography
 Alex Munoz – engineer, producer
 Matt Ross-Spang – engineer, mixing, producer
 Nathanio Strimpopulos – artwork

Chart positions

Weekly charts

Year-end charts

References

External links
 
 

2016 debut albums
Margo Price albums
Third Man Records albums
Albums produced by Matt Ross-Spang